Aquimarina addita  is a Gram-negative, strictly aerobic, rod-shaped and motile  bacterium from the genus of Aquimarina which has been isolated from the alga Tichocarpus crinitus.

References 

Flavobacteria
Bacteria described in 2018